Pietro Tordi (12 July 1906 – 14 December 1990) was an Italian film actor. He appeared in 100 films between 1942 and 1988. He was born in Florence, Italy.

Selected filmography

 Doctor Antonio (1937) - L'altro conspiratore
 Don Cesare di Bazan (1942) - Uno dei finti attori
 Pazzo d'amore (1942) - Giovannone
 Dagli Appennini alle Ande (1943) - Ulano, un contadino
 I nostri sogni (1943) - Il macchinista electricista (uncredited)
 The Walls of Malapaga (1949) - (uncredited)
 Il falco rosso (1949) - Demetrio
 Captain Demonio (1950)
 Son of d'Artagnan (1950)
 Ring Around the Clock (1950) - Fausto
 Figaro Here, Figaro There (1950) - Fiorello
 Il monello della strada (1950) - Zeno
 Strano appuntamento (1950)
 Quo Vadis (1951) - Galba
 Attention! Bandits! (1951) - Diplomat
 O.K. Nerone (1951) - Gladiator of Gaul
 The Seven Dwarfs to the Rescue (1951)
 Messalina (1951) - Un ceffo della suburra / Un malfrat des bas-quartiers (uncredited)
 Napoleon (1951) - Enrico
 Licenza premio (1951) - Zingaro
 The Mistress of Treves (1952) - Orso
 Abracadabra (1952) - Giacomo
 Rome 11:00 (1952) - The Architect
 Red Shirts (1952) - Carlo Ferrari
 Deceit (1952) - L'altro complice della baronessa
 In Olden Days (1952)
 The Queen of Sheba (1952) - Onabar
 Carne inquieta (1952)
 Il prezzo dell'onore (1953)
 I Chose Love (1953)
 Ivan (il figlio del diavolo bianco) (1953)
 Di qua, di là del Piave (1954)
 The Captain of Venice (1954) - Conte Gritti
 Crossed Swords (1954) - The Duke
 Guai ai vinti (1954) - (uncredited)
 Days of Love (1954) - Il parroco
 La grande avventura (1954)
 Toto in Hell (1955) - Il vero pazzo
 Adriana Lecouvreur (1955)
 The Miller's Beautiful Wife (1955) - Sergente ubriaco
 Te sto aspettanno (1956) - Capotecnico
 I miliardari (1956) - Il portiere
 Roland the Mighty (1956) - Ubaldo
 Porta un bacione a Firenze (1956) - Pascucci
 Kean - Genio e sregolatezza (1957) - Cochrane
 The Dragon's Blood (1957)
 Il cavaliere senza terra (1957)
 Il mondo dei miracoli (1959)
 Un maledetto imbroglio (1959) - The Motel Manager
 Ben Hur (1959) - Pilate's Servant (uncredited)
 I baccanali di Tiberio (1960)
 The Huns (1960) - Morobas
 The Giants of Thessaly (1960) - Telamone
 Le ambiziose (1961)
 The Story of Joseph and His Brethren (1961) - Enemy (uncredited)
 Divorce Italian Style (1961) - Attorney De Marzi
 Gladiator of Rome (1962) - Slave guard Cassio
 Musketeers of the Sea (1962) - Il Nostromo
 Appuntamento in Riviera (1962)
  (1963) - Le Préfet de police
 Mare matto (1963) - Il Poeta
 Le monachine (1963)
 Hercules, Samson and Ulysses (1963) - Azer
 Brennus, Enemy of Rome (1963) - Vaxo
 The Thief of Damascus (1964)
 I marziani hanno 12 mani (1964) - Contadino abruzzese
 Devil of the Desert Against the Son of Hercules (1964) - Bidder at Auction in Red Turbant
 The Road to Fort Alamo (1964) - Bartender (uncredited)
 Minnesota Clay (1964)
 Man Called Gringo (1965) - Sam Martin
 Marvelous Angelique (1965) - Le grand Coërse
 Letti sbagliati (1965) - Il professor Vittorio Foconi (segment "Il complicato")
 La colt è la mia legge (1965) - Doc
 Latin Lovers (1965) - (segment "L'irreparabile")
 Sette contro tutti (1965)
 Fantômas se déchaîne (1965) - Le président de l'Assemblée
 Mondo pazzo... gente matta! (1966) - General Manager
 Seasons of Our Love (1966) - Mario Borghi
 Missione sabbie roventi (1966)
 For a Few Dollars Less (1966) - Black
 Arizona Colt (1966) - Oriest
 Rojo (1966) - Saloon Customer
 Wanted (1967) - Pete Collins - Barman (uncredited)
 Luana, the Girl Tarzan (1968) - Norman
 Uno di più all'inferno (1968) - Pastor Steve
 The Son of Black Eagle (1968)
 Torture Me But Kill Me with Kisses (1968) - Fra' Arduino
 Buona Sera, Mrs. Campbell (1968) - Priest (uncredited)
 Italiani! È severamente proibito servirsi della toilette durante le fermate (1969)
 Le lys de mer (1969)
 Franco, Ciccio e il pirata Barbanera (1969) - Il Pirata John
 Kill Django... Kill First (1971) - Le shérif 
 Il merlo maschio (1971) - Doctor
 In the Name of the Italian People (1971) - Professor Rivaroli
 Le belve (1971) - Lawyer of Sparapaoli sisters (segment "Processo a porte chiuse")
 Il vero e il falso (1972) - Carabinieri Officier in Latina
 Lo chiameremo Andrea (1972)
 What? (1972) - Caretaker
 Decameroticus (1972) - Vulfardo - the judge
 We Want the Colonels (1973) - General Giovanni Bassi-Lega
 The Assassination of Matteotti (1973) - Zepelli - the Alta Corte del Senato President
 The Three Musketeers of the West (1973) - Dart senior
 Claretta and Ben (1974) - Old actor in Naples
 Conviene far bene l'amore (1975)
 La professoressa di lingue (1976) - col. Trombatore
 La pretora (1976) - Pavanin
 Puttana galera! (1976)
 Passi furtivi in una notte boia (1976) - Ragnini
 Lettomania (1976) - Hermann Tiller
 An Average Little Man (1977)
 Pane, burro e marmellata (1977) - The Priest (uncredited)
 How to Lose a Wife and Find a Lover (1978) - The Chaplain in the armed services
 Dear Father (1979) - Padre di albino
 Velvet Hands (1979)
 The Return of Casanova (1980)
 Lion of the Desert (1980) - Field Marshal
 Il Marchese del Grillo (1981) - Monsignor Terenzio
 Petomaniac (1983) - Principe D'Orleans
 Fotoromanzo (1986)
 Momo (1986) - Ettore
 Stradivari (1988) - Friar Mendicant
 I giorni randagi (1988) - Grandfather
 Dark Illness (1990)

References

External links

1906 births
1990 deaths
20th-century Italian male actors
Accademia Nazionale di Arte Drammatica Silvio D'Amico alumni
Italian male film actors
Actors from Florence